No. 269 Squadron RAF was a maritime patrol unit of the Royal Air Force that saw service in World War I, World War II, and the Cold War.

Service history

World War I
On 6 October 1918, No. 269 Squadron was formed from Nos. 431 and 432 Flights at the seaplane station based at Port Said which had been established there since January 1916, under the command of Major P.L Holmes, RAF. No. 269 was part  64th Wing, and it operated seaplanes from the harbor, plus land-based flight of B.E.2e and Airco DH.9 aircraft.  The squadron conducted maritime patrols until the Armistice, and on 15 September 1919, its seaplanes were moved to Alexandria and merged with No. 270 Squadron as its landplane flight had been disbanded in March 1919. The squadron continued as No. 269 until it was disbanded on 15 November 1919.

Inter-war Period
On 7 December 1936, C Flight of No. 206 Squadron at RAF Bircham Newton was redesignated 269 Squadron.  The squadron was moved to RAF Abbotsinch, near Glasgow, later that month, and its Avro Anson aircraft undertook coastal reconnaissance patrols. On 9 March 1939, the squadron moved to RAF Montrose and began flying maritime patrols off the east coast of Scotland.

World War II

1939
No. 269 Squadron was transferred to RAF Wick on 10 October 1939, and executed aerial attacks against surfaced German U-boats on 15 September, 18 October, 28 October, 3 November, 19 November, and 3 December. Postwar examination of Kriegsmarine records showed that these attacks either did little damage or a U-boat was not on patrol in the area of attack.

1940
Aircraft from No. 269 Squadron made six separate attacks on German U-boats during February 1940, plus attacks on 8 August. No. 269 Squadron also carried out a number of missions in addition to its maritime patrol duties:

 1 March — The Stavanger airfield was attacked.
 22 June — Aircraft from the No. 269 Squadron and No. 442 Squadron RAF attacked the German battleship Scharnhorst while at sea north of Bergen, but inflicted little damage on the German warship.
 27 June — No. 269 Squadron executed a special mission reconnaissance of Norwegian coast.

The squadron also began receiving new Lockheed Hudson patrol bombers starting in March 1940, completing the transition on 15 April, while it ceased operating Avro Anson aircraft as of 1 June. By 15 July, No, 269 Squadron was fully operational with 18 Hudson Mk1 aircraft.

1941
After a year of operations against enemy shipping from RAF Wick, No. 269 Squadron began transferring to Iceland starting on 12 April 1941, with the last Hudson aircraft arriving on 30 May. The squadron completed its re-deployment to Iceland on 10 July. A detachment of No. 269 Squadron deployed to RAF Reykjavik on 12 December.

On 9 April, six aircraft from RAF Wick bombed the aluminium factory at Hoyanger, Norway. Also during late May, the squadron participated in the pursuit of the German battleship Bismarck. Aircraft from No. 269 Squadron also made four separate attacks on surfaced U-boats during June. On 6 August,  Hudson patrol bombers from No. 269 Squadron escorted USAF fighter aircraft of the 33rd Pursuit Squadron to the Reykjavik airfield after being catapulted off the aircraft carrier . On 16 August, No. 269 Squadron flew twelve sorties escorting the battleship , with British Prime Minister Winston Churchill aboard for the upcoming, top-secret conference with U.S. President Franklin D. Roosevelt. Aircraft from No. 269 Squadron made four separate attacks on surfaced U-boats during June.

On 27 August 1941, Squadron Leader J.H. Thompson of the No. 269 Squadron made RAF history by becoming the only aircraft captain to have a U-boat surrender to him. Thompson and his navigator/bomb-aimer—Flying Officer John Coleman—were awarded the Distinguished Flying Cross on 23 September 1941.

1942
No. 269 aircraft made eight separate U-boat attacks during August. Six U-boats were attacked during September.  was attacked on 3 October. No. 269 Squadron scored its first confirmed U-boat kill by sinking  on 5 October.

1943
No. 269 Squadron attacked four U-boats during January, and Four Hudson aircraft were deployed to the Bluie West One airfield in Greenland on 29 January. Six U-boats were attacked in June, and No. 269 aircraft sank  on 5 July.

On 13 December, No. 269 Squadron began its temporary transfer from RAF Reykjavik to RAF Davidstow Moor prior to its 1944 deployment to the Azores. The squadron was re-equipped with Supermarine Walrus I and Vickers Warwick I ASRI aircraft, as well as retaining its extant Hudson Mk III patrol aircraft. The squadron also received Miles Martinet I aircraft for target-towing purposes. This transfer was completed on 8 January 1944,

1944 - 1946
No. 269 Squadron completed its deployment to RAF Lagens in the Azores with its Hudson Mk IIIA, Martinet, Walrus and Spitfire Mk V aircraft. The short-range aircraft were launched off the escort aircraft carrier . Later in October, some Warwick aircraft were added to the squadron. For the rest of the war it flew air-sea rescue missions, as well as meteorological and target towing sorties. Following the end of World War II, No. 269 Squadron was disbanded on 10 March 1946.

Cold War

No. 269 Squadron was reformed at North Front, Gibraltar, on 1 January 1952 from part of No. 224 Squadron and moved on 24 March to RAF Ballykelly, Ulster, as a  maritime reconnaissance unit equipped with Avro Shackleton patrol bombers.  No. 269 Squadron participated in a number of military exercises, including Exercise Encompass in January 1956 and Operation Mosaic in February 1956, as well as NATO's Operation Strikeback in September 1957. On 1 December 1958 the squadron was re-numbered as No. 210 Squadron.  On 22 July 1959, No 269 Squadron reformed at RAF Caistor as a Thor Missile Squadron in Bomber Command as  part of the Thor Missile Force based at RAF Hemswell.  No. 269 Squadron was disbanded on 24 May 1963.

Aircraft
The following aircraft were assigned to No. 269 Squadron during its operation service arranged in chronological order:

 World War I:
 Royal Aircraft Factory B.E.2eOct. 1918 to Mar. 1919
 Short Type 184Oct. 1918 to Nov. 1919
 Airco DH.9Dec. 1918 to Mar. 1919

 World War II:
 Avro Anson IDec. 1936 to Jun. 1940
 Locheed Hudson IApr. 1940 to May 1941
 Lockheed Hudson IIOct. 1940 to May 1941
 Locheed Hudson IIIMay 1941 to Dec. 1943
 Lockheed Hudson IIIAFeb. 1944 to Aug. 1945
 Spitfire VBFeb. 1944 to Mar. 1946
 Miles Martinet IFeb. 1944 to Jul. 1944
 Supermarine Walrus IFeb. 1944 to Mar 1946
 Vickers Warwick ISept. 1944 to Mar. 1946

 Cold War:
 Shackleton MR Mk 1Jan. 1952 to Nov. 1958
 Shackleton MR Mk 2Mar. 1952 to Aug. 1954Oct. 1958 to Nov. 1958
 PGM-17 ThorJul. 1959 to May 1963

References

Notes

Bibliography

 Halley, James J. The Squadrons of the Royal Air Force & Commonwealth, 1918 -1988. Tonbridge, Kent, UK: Air Britain (Historians) Ltd., 1988. .
 Jefford, C.G. RAF Squadrons, a Comprehensive Record of the Movement and Equipment of all RAF Squadrons and their Antecedents since 1912. Shrewsbury: Airlife Publishing, 1998 (second edition 2001). .
 Rayner, Ted. Coastal Command Pilot, 1939-1945: Wartime Experiences with 220 & 269 Squadrons. Bognor Regis, West Sussex, UK: Woodfield Publishing Ltd., 1994. .
 Rawlings, John D.R. Coastal, Support and Special Squadrons of the RAF and their Aircraft. London: Jane's Publishing Company Ltd., 1982. .

External links

 Royal Air Force
 History of No. 269 Squadron
 Air of Authority: A History of RAF Organisation
 No. 269 Squadron
 Aircraft and Markings
 RAF Command
 No. 269 Squadron RAF
 No. 269 Squadron RAF – Old Comrades' Association
 RAF Davidstow Moor

Military units and formations established in 1918
269
1918 establishments in the United Kingdom